Luis Alers (20 September 1950 – 9 January 2005) was a Puerto Rican sprinter. He competed in the men's 100 metres at the 1972 Summer Olympics.

References

1950 births
2005 deaths
Athletes (track and field) at the 1972 Summer Olympics
People from Aguadilla, Puerto Rico
Puerto Rican male sprinters
Olympic track and field athletes of Puerto Rico